The Roman Catholic Diocese of Toowoomba is a Latin Rite suffragan diocese of the Archdiocese of Brisbane, established in 1929, covering the Darling Downs and south west regions of Queensland, Australia.

St Patrick's Cathedral is the seat of the Catholic Bishop of Toowoomba. The diocese covers an area of 487,000 km2. with 48 priests and 57 members of religious orders.  There are 77,400 Catholics among the 276,700 total population within the diocese's borders.

History
In 1929, the Diocese of Toowoomba was excised from the Roman Catholic Archdiocese of Brisbane.

Recent history
 

Bishop Bill Morris was appointed in 1992 to head the Toowoomba diocese. In 2006 he released a pastoral letter calling for discussion of the ordination of married men and the ordination of women to compensate for the lack of priests in his large diocese.

An apostolic visitation of the diocese was conducted by Charles J. Chaput OFM Cap., then Archbishop of Denver, during April 2007.  Discussions continued between Morris and the Vatican for several years.

On 1 May 2011, Bishop Morris announced his early retirement at age 67, stressing the fact that he had not resigned. On 2 May 2011, the Holy See removed Morris from pastoral care of the diocese, attracting international press coverage.  The Holy See appointed Brian Vincent Finnigan, Auxiliary Bishop of the Roman Catholic Archdiocese of Brisbane, to serve as Apostolic Administrator of the Diocese.

On 14 May 2012, it was announced that Pope Benedict XVI had named the Reverend Monsignor Robert McGuckin as bishop-elect of the Toowoomba diocese. He was installed on 11 July.

Bishops

Ordinaries
The following have served as Bishops of Toowoomba:
{| class="wikitable"
!Order
!Name
!Date enthroned
!Reign ended
!Term of office
!Reason for term end
|-
|align="center"| || James Byrne ||align="center"| 28 May 1929 ||align="center"| 11 February 1938 ||align="right"|  || Died in office
|-
|align="center"| || Joseph Basil Roper || align="center" | 13 July 1938 ||align="center"| 14 October 1952 ||align="right"|  || Resigned and appointed Bishop Emeritus of Toowoomba
|-
|align="center"| || William Joseph Brennan || align="center" | 7 August 1953 ||align="center"|  ||align="right"|  || Died in office
|-
|align="center"| || Edward Francis Kelly,  || align="center" | 19 December 1975 ||align="center"|20 November 1992 ||align="right"|  || Retired and appointed Bishop Emeritus
|-
|align="center"| || William Morris ||align="center"|  ||align="center"| 2 May 2011 ||align="right"| ||  Retired and appointed Bishop Emeritus
|-
|align="center"| || Robert McGuckin ||align="center"| 11 July 2012 ||align="center"| present ||align="right"|   || 
|-
|}

Other priest of this diocese who became bishop
John Alexius Bathersby, appointed Bishop of Cairns in 1986, and subsequently Archbishop of Brisbane.

Parishes
There are currently 35 parishes in the diocese and 42 diocesan priests.

Schools 
The diocese has the following schools:
 Our Lady of the Southern Cross College, Dalby
St. Mary's College, Toowoomba
St Ursula's College, Toowoomba
St Joseph's College, Toowoomba
St. Mary's School, Charleville
St. Finbarr's School, Quilpie
St Saviour's College, Toowoomba
Downlands Sacred Heart College, Toowoomba
Mary MacKillop Catholic College, Toowoomba

Heritage listings 
The diocese has a number of heritage-listed sites, including:
 corner of James and Neil Streets, Toowoomba: St Patrick's Cathedral
 73 Margaret Street, Toowoomba: Bishop's House

Sexual abuse
In February 2014 the Royal Commission into Institutional Responses to Child Sexual Abuse, a royal commission of inquiry initiated in 2013 by the Australian Government and supported by all of its state governments, began an investigation into allegations of child sexual abuse and the response by the Diocesan Catholic Education Office. The former Bishop of Toowoomba, Bill Morris, admitted that "there had been a number of significant systemic failings which led to the failure to properly deal with" the abuse of thirteen young girls at a Toowoomba Catholic primary School in 2007–08.

See also

Roman Catholicism in Australia

References

Further reading 
 Brian Sparksman: The Practice of Ecumenism in a Rural Australian Diocese. In: Catholic University of America: The Jurist 69 (2008), p. 114–135 (online via paid subscription).

External links 

 
Toowoomba
Toowoomba
Toowoomba
Toowoomba